The Skull Creek massacre refers to the murder of at least 19 Karankawa people in Mexican Texas by Texian Militia in February 1823. Before 1823, there were few settlers of European heritage from the United States in the state of Texas. With the formation of the First Mexican Republic in 1823 and the opening of Mexican Texas to colonists from the United States, white people began to settle in the state. The subsequent pushing of Native Americans off of their land, combined with Native American raids on the new settlers' cattle, led to deep hostility and conflict between the two groups.

After two colonists were killed by Coco people (a subgroup of the Karankawa), a Texian Militia company of 26 men was formed by Robert Kuykendall. The company attacked a Karankawa village on Skull Creek, killing 19 people and razing homes after stealing their possessions. There was no punishment for the attack and hostilities continued until free Indians were eliminated from the land.

History

Background
In the Galveston Bay area, white colonists were still a minority in the 1820s. The newest settlers came from well-settled regions of the American South and were not accustomed to living among large Indian populations in a non-dominant relationship. For instance, they took new settlements without offering substantial gifts, sharing the land, or allowing the customary depredation of their livestock that Tejanos who had previously lived in the region had grown accustomed to. In 1823, Stephen F. Austin began to claim rich tracts of land near bays and river mouths populated by the Karankawa. The Karankawa relied on these bays for the fish and shellfish that provided their winter protein sources and thus were fiercely protective of that land.

Austin wrote upon scouting the land that extermination of the Karankawa would be necessary, despite the fact that his first encounter with the tribe was friendly. He spread rumors among the settlers of cannibalism and extreme violence of the Karankawa, sometimes more specifically the Carancaguases. Research has suggested that these accusations of cannibalism were false, possibly caused by confusion with another tribe, and that the Karankawa were horrified by cannibalism when they learned of it being practiced by shipwrecked Spaniards. Austin's stories primed the colonists to believe that the Karankawa would be impossible to live among.

Incident
In February 1823, Coco Indians killed two colonists. Although the circumstances are unclear, one theory is that this occurred while they were stealing corn. The colonists, led by Robert Kuykendall, gathered twenty-six Texian Militia who found a Karankawa village on Skull Creek. They killed at least 19 inhabitants of the village, then stole the villagers' possessions and burned their homes to the ground. Multiple participants in the slaughter cited the cannibalism and "warlike" or "repugnant" nature of the Karankawa as a justification for the massacre.

Aftermath
None of the attackers faced repercussions for their act.

The colonists soon began working on an alliance with the Tonkawa Indians of the region, whom they saw as "great beggars" who did not threaten their desires to settle on the land. Through them, Austin began encouraging and exacerbating warfare between the competing Indian tribes and the elimination of the Karankawa, as well as continuing to attack the "hostile" Indians themselves. There were further battles and one-sided massacres, and by 1824 the local Carancaguase chief Antonio signed a treaty abandoning their homelands east of the Guadalupe River. Soon this treaty was violated on both sides, leading to Austin’s 1825 orders to pursue and kill all Karankawa on sight, the Dressing Point Massacre and the eventual permanent loss of the land by the local Indians by 1827. Having difficulty in finding uninhabited regions in which a living could be had, the remaining bands of Karankawa scattered out, became day laborers in cities and on plantations, were taken as slaves by Austin's settlers, or were killed in later conflicts. By 1860, free Karankawa had been eliminated.

See also
Texian Militia
List of conflicts involving the Texas Military
List of Indian massacres
Terrorism in the United States

Notes

References

1823 in the United States
1823 in Texas
February 1823 events
Massacres in 1823
Native American history of Texas
Massacres of Native Americans
History of Texas
Karankawa people
Military history of Texas
History of racism in Texas
1823 in North America
1823 murders in North America